Jenny Preece also known as Jennifer  Preece (born 15 January 1999) is a South African professional squash player who currently plays for South Africa women's national squash team. She achieved her highest career PSA singles ranking of 176 in February 2020 during the 2019-20 PSA World Tour.

References

External links 

 Profile at PSA
 

1999 births
Living people
South African female squash players
Sportspeople from Kimberley, Northern Cape